Switzerland competed at the 2006 Winter Olympics in Turin, Italy. This was the confederation's largest Winter Olympics team ever, because two ice hockey teams qualified (men and women).

Medalists

Alpine skiing

Switzerland won three medals in alpine skiing, with the best performance a silver from Martina Schild in the women's downhill. Bruno Kernen finished 17th in the final men's downhill training run, but improved in the race itself, winning the bronze medal.

Men

Women

Note: In the men's combined, run 1 is the downhill, and runs 2 and 3 are the slalom. In the women's combined, run 1 and 2 are the slalom, and run 3 the downhill.

Biathlon 

Matthias Simmen earned Switzerland's only top 25 finish in Biathlon, as a near-clean shooting performance left him solidly positioned in the men's pursuit.

Bobsleigh 

Martin Annen piloted the Switzerland-1 sled in the two-man and the four-man, and in both events won a bronze medal. In each case, his team fell behind on the third run, but then performed well on the final run to earn a medal.

Cross-country skiing 

The Swiss cross-country team had only a single top-10 finish, a 7th place from the men's relay. The women's relay team, which earned a bronze medal in Salt Lake City, finished 11th.

Distance

Sprint

Curling 

In the men's event, 2006 European champion Ralph Stöckli finished the round robin at 5 wins, one short of the mark needed to progress to the medal round. On the women's side, Mirjam Ott, who won a silver medal as a third in 2002, made the final in 2006 as well, this time as a skip. Her rink finished second in the round robin before beating Canada in the semifinals. In the final, the Swiss managed to tie the game in the 10th end, forcing an extra, but Swedish skip Anette Norberg made a difficult shot to leave the Swiss with silver again.

Men's tournament

Team: Ralph Stöckli (skip), Claudio Pescia, Pascal Sieber, Simon Strübin, Marco Battilana (alternate)Round Robin
Draw 1
;Draw 3
;Draw 5
;Draw 6
;Draw 7
;Draw 8
;Draw 9
;Draw 11
;Draw 12

Standings

Women's tournament

: Mirjam Ott (skip), Binia Beeli, Valeria Spälty, Michèle Moser, Manuela Kormann (alternate) '''

Round Robin
Draw 1
;Draw 2
;Draw 3
;Draw 5
;Draw 6
;Draw 7
;Draw 8
;Draw 10
;Draw 12

Standings

Playoffs
Semifinal
;Final

Key: The hammer indicates which team had the last stone in the first end.

Figure skating 

2005 World champion Stéphane Lambiel was one of the few medal challengers to have two consistent performances, and his 4th-placed free skate and 3rd-placed short program were good enough to earn him a silver medal.

Key: CD = Compulsory Dance, FD = Free Dance, FS = Free Skate, OD = Original Dance, SP = Short Program

Freestyle skiing 

2005 World Championships silver medalist Evelyne Leu sat 5th after the first jump in the |women's aerials final, but on her second jump, she put up the highest score of the competition, earning her a gold medal.

Ice hockey 

The Swiss men's team had the two biggest upsets of the Olympic ice hockey tournament, beating the 1998 and 2002 gold medalists, the Czech Republic and Canada in back-to-back games. The win against Canada was the first time the Swiss had beaten that nation in an international competition, and required a stellar goaltending show from Martin Gerber, who earned a shutout. The team made the medal round, but lost in the quarter-finals to eventual champions Sweden. The women's team was less successful, losing each of its first four games before eventually finishing 7th.

Men's tournament

Players

Round-robin

Medal round

Quarterfinal

Women's tournament

Players

Round-robin

Medal round

Classification 5–8

7th place game

Luge 

Neither Swiss luger managed to challenge for the top positions.

Nordic combined 

No individual Swiss athlete finished in the top 20 in Nordic Combined, but the team put on a strong run in the last two legs of the cross-country portion to finish fourth, though they were more than a minute back of a medal spot.

Note: 'Deficit' refers to the amount of time behind the leader a competitor began the cross-country portion of the event. Italicized numbers show the final deficit from the winner's finishing time.

Skeleton 

Maya Pedersen-Bieri won gold at both the 2001 and 2005 World championships, and comfortably took the Olympic title, winning by more than a full second and being the only woman to complete a run in less than a minute. Her 59.64 second time in the first run was a new women's track record at Cesana Pariol. Gregor Stähli was fifth after the first run, bu when others ahead of him faltered, he put together a solid run to earn a bronze medal.

Ski jumping 

Simon Ammann, a double gold medalist in Salt Lake, could not recapture that form in Turin, where his best finish was 15th in the large hill event. Andreas Küttel was pre-qualified in both events, but poor second jumps in both left him outside the medals.

Note: PQ indicates a skier was pre-qualified for the final, based on entry rankings.

Snowboarding 

The Swiss Olympic team won four medals in snowboarding, more than in any other sport. Three of these came in the parallel giant slalom, as the Swiss swept the golds in both the men's and women's events. Daniela Meuli was seeded 6th after the qualifying run, but overcame deficits twice to make the final, and then won after her German opponent fell. Philipp Schoch earned his second consecutive gold medal in the men's event, winning the final against his brother Simon. In the women's snowboard cross final, Tanja Frieden was the beneficiary of American Lindsey Jacobellis's fall on the final hill, sweeping past the American to claim the gold medal.

Halfpipe

Note: In the final, the single best score from two runs is used to determine the ranking. A bracketed score indicates a run that wasn't counted.

Parallel GS

Key: '+ Time' represents a deficit; the brackets indicate the results of each run.

Snowboard cross

References

Further reading
Bis heute selektionierte Athleten , from the Swiss Olympic Association, retrieved 26 January 2006

Nations at the 2006 Winter Olympics
2006
Winter Olympics